The Bamboo Saucer is a independently made 1968 Cold War science fiction film drama about competing American and Russian teams that discover a flying saucer in Communist China.  The film was re-released in 1969 under the title Collision Course with an edited down runtime of 90 minutes.

This was the final film for both actors Dan Duryea and Nan Leslie.

Plot
Test pilot Fred Norwood is flying the experimental X-109 jet aircraft accompanied by a chase plane. During the flight testing, Norwood finds himself pursued by a flying saucer and has to engage in a series of tricky aerobatics to protect his aircraft.

Once on the ground, Norwood is informed that the radar tracking his jet picked up no other aircraft near him except the chase plane. Though Norwood insists on what he saw, his superiors, who were monitoring his vital signs, think he has had a series of hallucinations and order him off the project. Blanchard, the USAF pilot of the chase plane, exits a room in an unusually frightened and nervous state; he parrots words about not seeing another aircraft on the flight and that the reported event was merely an aerial inversion. When Blanchard falters with his explanation, he is again prompted what to say by the panel members in the room.

Now angered and determined, Norwood decides to prove what he saw by patrolling the area in a North American P-51 Mustang equipped with laser radar until he reaches the point of exhaustion. As Norwood sleeps, his best friend, Joe Vetry, a fellow pilot who is married to Norwood's sister Dorothy, takes off in the Mustang when radar picks up an unidentified flying object. Norwood and Dorothy view Joe's aircraft vanish off the radar screen; later Federal Aviation Administration crash investigators tell Norwood that his friend's Mustang disintegrated in midair in a manner similar to the accounts of the Mantell UFO incident.

Norwood finds himself summoned to Washington D.C. Hank Peters, a member of an influential, unnamed agency of the United States Government, not only believes his account but shows him a sketch that Norwood identifies as the same object that buzzed his test aircraft. Peters tells Norwood that the sketch was provided from intelligence sources based in Red China. Due to Norwood's familiarity with a variety of aircraft, he is asked to accompany Peters and two scientists who will be parachuted into Red China. Peters informs him that there are reliable sources that say two humanoid aliens in the saucer later died, likely from exposure to Earth bacteria; due to rapid deterioration, their bodies were cremated.

At the Chinese drop zone, they are met by American agent Sam Archibald who leads them to the saucer now hidden inside the ruins of a Catholic church. Due to the Communists having destroyed the church, the locals assist the Americans in any way possible. On traveling to their destination while evading units of the People's Liberation Army, they run across a party of Russian scientists led by their own version of Agent Peters. The two parties decide to cooperate in investigating the hidden saucer.

After a tense altercation, the Americans and one of the Russian scientists board the saucer, activate it, and fly out of Chinese airspace, while under fire from enemy soldiers. A pre-programmed course instantly takes control and flies them away from Earth  past the Moon, past Mars, and toward Saturn. Unable to return unless they work together to control the alien UFO, they are finally successful and able to re-enter Earth's atmosphere (a quote from President John F. Kennedy about mutual human cooperation in space flashes on screen).

Production
Jerry Fairbanks was a producer and sometimes director of a variety of cinematic short subjects series such as Strange as It Seems and Popular Science. A 1954 film trade article stated that Fairbanks was preparing his first theatrical motion picture, titled Project Saucer that was to be filmed in widescreen and color. A 1964 article stated that Fairbanks was moving production of his film Operation Blue Book from a runaway production in Spain to be filmed in the USA.<ref>p. 3  Fairbanks Brings Back Runaway From Spain Official Bulletin of the International Alliance of Theatrical Stage Employees and Moving Picture Machine Operators of the United States and Canada, Issues 440-457 International Alliance of Theatrical Stage Employees and Moving Picture Machine Operators of the United States and Canada IATSE, 1964 - Theaters</ref>

Fairbanks persevered and had a collaborator, Frank Telford, rewrite the screenplay by Alford "Rip" Van Ronkel and special effects man John P. Fulton with Telford directing the film in 1966. Fairbanks contacted the office of the United States Secretary of Defense about his screenplay. In a April 12, 1966 reply, the Office of the Assistant Secretary of Defense informed Fairbanks that they had a "negative reaction" to Project Saucer. They recommended that the screenplay delete any reference to the CIA, saying it would not be appropriate to place one of their operatives in the fictionalized situation. Furthermore, the flying saucer investigation was not factually set up; the Air Force's General was an unnecessarily uncomplimentary character and would not act as he does in the screenplay; it was also not clear just what part the Air Force played in the aircraft testing; any one of the aircraft manufacturers could clarify the film's opening sequence; finally, the Air Force should not be utilized or included in the air drop inside Chinese air space

Fairbanks incorporated the changes in the finished screenplay. Co-screenwriter, associate producer, and special effects expert John P. Fulton died during filming. The film was retitled The Bamboo Saucer, though it had no relation to the 1967 published science fiction novel The Flight of the Bamboo Saucer. The experimental X-109 aircraft was actually Air Force stock footage of a Lockheed F-104 Starfighter. The film was shot in 1966p. 64 Films and Filming, Volume 13 Hansom Books, 1966 by cinematographer Hal Mohr at Lone Pine, California, where a standing Western Street set was turned into a Chinese village for the production.

Cast
 Dan Duryea as Hank Peters
 John Ericson as Norwood
 Lois Nettleton as Anna Karachev
 Robert Hastings as Garson (as Bob Hastings)
 Vincent Beck as Zagorsky
 Bernard Fox as Ephram
 Robert Dane as Miller
 Rico Cattani as Dubovsky
 James Hong as Sam Archibald
 Bartlett Robinson as Rhodes
 Nick Katurich as Gadyakoff
 William Mims as Joe Vetry (as Bill Mims)
 Nan Leslie as Dorothy Vetry 
 Andy Romano as Blanchard

Soundtrack
 Yablochkocomposed by Reinhold Glière

Home mediaThe Bamboo Saucer was released on DVD and Blu-ray in April 2014 by Olive Films, formatted in the anamorphic widescreen 1.78:1 aspect ratio. It is also available for   viewing at YouTube.

See also
List of American films of 1968
The 1950 independently made Cold War science fiction film The Flying Saucer Hangar 18, a similar film from 1980
 2010: The Year We Make Contact'', a film from 1984 featuring US-Soviet collaboration

References

External links

1968 films
American science fiction films
Cold War films
Films set in China
1960s science fiction films
Cold War spy films
American spy films
UFO-related films
Films shot in California
1960s English-language films
1960s American films